Rafig Hashimov - "Honored Artist of Azerbaijan", announcer of AzTV, tele-journalist, essayist, director.

Early life and education
Hashimov Rafig Mahammad was born in 1966. He graduated from “Television and radio equipment” faculty of Baku Communication Electronics technical school in 1985. He served in the Soviet Army in 1985–1987.

Career
In 1987, has started to work at Azerbaijan State Tele-radio Broadcast Company as technician. Afterwards, he worked as videographer, erector. Since 1990, works as an announcer. In 1997, has graduated “Journalism” faculty of Baku State University. During these years, he was an announcer of “News”, different state events, “XX century” author program, “Morning” program. He trained the announcers from “Space”, “Leader” and “Khazar” channels with their speeches, taught speech culture at “Khazar” university for 4 years. His stories and essays, translations into Azerbaijani from the world classics literature, as well as from Nobel Prize laureate Hermann Hesse, Czeslaw Milosz, Jorge Luis Borxes, were published in the magazines and newspapers in our country. Over 20 featured-documentary films had been shot based on his scenarios. . According to the request by the Ministry of Culture and Tourism, he had produced feature-documentary film named “Unfinished dairy” dedicated to the Martyr Fuad Asadov in 2011 and documentary film named “Sattar’s Azerbaijan” dedicated to prominent Azerbaijani artist Sattar Bahlulzadeh in 2014. He prepared films and programs dedicated to the prominent figures of science, culture and art as the author and announcer of the cultural author program series “XX century”. Since 2008, he is a member of the Writer's Union of Azerbaijan. On November 4, 1998, he was awarded to the title of the "Honored Artist of Azerbaijan" according to the decree by Nationwide Leader Heydar Aliyev.

Filmography 

 1996 - “The third side of the gramophone record” - documentary - screenwriter - with Vali Sayyadi 
 1997 - “A grain of sand” - documentary - screenwriter - with Elchin Musaoglu
 1997 - “Dairy of the traveler” - documentary - screenwriter
 1999 - “Magister  dixit” - documentary - screenwriter
 2000 - “The sun and the cloud” - documentary - screenwriter
 2003 - "Phenomenon of two centuries" - documentary - screenwriter and director
 2003 - “Light of my eyes” - documentary - screenwriter
 2004 - "I call the stars with your name” - documentary - screenwriter and director
 2006 - “Dreams of the reed city” - documentary - screenwriter - with Salim Babullaoglu
 2006 - “Announcer” - documentary - screenwriter and director
 2011 - “Unfinished dairy” - documentary - screenwriter (with Vali Sayyadi) and director
 2013 - "Sattar's Azerbaijan" - documentary - screenwriter and director
 2015 - "Water of Fireland" - documentary - screenwriter and director

Stories 
 ”Nest” - 1999
 ”One Hour” - 2010
 ”In the fear of the God” - 2005
 ”The Bridge” - 1999
 ”Qaraböcək” - 1999

Essays 

 “The Book” - 1995
 “A Word” - 1999
 “The History” - 2004
 “The Children” - 1995
 “To Zahra” - 2011

Translations 
 Hermann Hesse - “The world history” — translation from Russian language
 Hermann Hesse - “Shelter” — translation from Russian language
 Jorge Luis Borges - “The Book” — translation from Russian language
 Czeslaw Milosz — “A puppy on the roadside” — translation from Russian language

Author programs 
 "XX century" — 1995-1999

References 

1966 births
Living people
Azerbaijani mass media people